Steven Gregory Zabel (born March 20, 1948) is a former American football linebacker and tight end who played in the National Football League (NFL). After playing college football at the University of Oklahoma, he was the first pick (six overall) by the Eagles in the 1970 NFL Draft.

In his ten-year career, he played in 124 games while starting in 95 of them, having 6 total interceptions and 13 fumble recoveries. He played 60 games for the Eagles, 49 for the Patriots, and 15 for the Colts. He was a member of the New England Patriots 1970s All-Decade Team.

He started parts of the 1970 and 1971 season as a tight end, having 10 total receptions for 123 yards and 3 touchdowns.

References

1948 births
Living people
Players of American football from Minneapolis
American football linebackers
American football tight ends
Philadelphia Eagles players
New England Patriots players
Baltimore Colts players
Oklahoma Sooners football players
New Mexico Military Institute Broncos football players